Jean le Goff (born 22 February 1944) is a French rower. He competed in the men's coxed four event at the 1968 Summer Olympics.

References

1944 births
Living people
French male rowers
Olympic rowers of France
Rowers at the 1968 Summer Olympics
People from Montrouge
Sportspeople from Hauts-de-Seine